AM-694 (1-(5-fluoropentyl)-3-(2-iodobenzoyl)indole) is a designer drug that acts as a potent and selective agonist for the cannabinoid receptor CB1. It is used in scientific research for mapping the distribution of CB1 receptors.

Pharmacology
AM-694 is an agonist for cannabinoid receptors. It has a Ki of 0.08 nM at CB1 and 18 times selectivity over CB2 with a Ki of 1.44 nM. It is unclear what is responsible for this unusually high CB1 binding affinity, but it makes the 18F radiolabelled derivative of AM-694 useful for mapping the distribution of CB1 receptors in the body.

Metabolism 
Pathways of metabolism include hydrolytic defluorination, carboxylation, and monohydroxylation of the N-alkyl chain.

See also 
 AM-679
 AM-1235
 AM-2201
 AM-2232
 AM-2233
 FUBIMINA
 JWH-018
 List of AM cannabinoids
 List of JWH cannabinoids
 THJ-2201

References 

Benzoylindoles
Iodoarenes
Organofluorides
AM cannabinoids
Designer drugs
PET radiotracers